Ariel Kleiman (born 1985 in Melbourne, Australia) is an Australian director and filmmaker based in London.

Biography
Kleiman was born to a Jewish family in Melbourne, Australia; his parents emigrated from Odessa, Ukraine in the 1970s. He graduated from the Victorian College of the Arts in 2010 where he studied Film & TV. He is currently in development on his first feature film, with production company Warp Films.

Works
Kleiman's second year film school film, Young Love, premiered at the Sundance Film Festival in 2010 where it was awarded an Honorable Mention in Short Film Making. That same year it was showcased in Issue 11 of Mcsweeny's DVD quarterly Wholphin. In May 2010 Kleiman's graduating film, Deeper Than Yesterday, premiered at the Cannes Film Festival's, Semaine de la Critique, where it was awarded the Kodak Discovery Award For Best Short Film. Deeper Than Yesterday was awarded best film prizes at over 20 film festivals, from Leeds to Beijing, including 2011 Sundance Film Festival where it won the Jury Prize in International Filmmaking.
In 2010 Kleiman also won SOYA Qantas Spirit of Youth award & Inside Film Rising Talent award.
In 2012 Kleiman's first feature film script won the Sundance Mahindra Global Filmmaking award and was selected for the Sundance Directors & Writers Labs. The film was expected to begin production in 2013. In 2015, Kleiman released a full-length film, Partisan, a thriller about child assassins, which was meant to star Oscar Isaac but instead starred Vincent Cassell.

Kleiman also directed the eighth episode of the Showtime drama series Yellowjackets, titled "Flight of the Bumblebee". Cast member Melanie Lynskey said "Flight of the Bumblebee" was her favorite episode to film because Kleiman allowed the cast to "play around" and improvise several scenes.

References

External links 
Ariel Kleiman's official site 

1985 births
Living people
Australian Jews
Australian film directors